Chilanga District is a district of Lusaka Province, Zambia. The capital of the district is Chilanga. It was separated from Kafue District in 2012.

References 

Districts of Lusaka Province